Julian Quintin Patrick Golley (born 12 September 1971) is a male retired British triple jumper.

Athletics career
Golley represented England and won the gold medal at the 1994 Commonwealth Games in Victoria, British Columbia, Canada, with a jump of 17.03 m. Four years later he represented England again, at the 1998 Commonwealth Games in Kuala Lumpur, Malaysia.

He also competed in the 1992 Summer Olympics in Barcelona, Spain and at the 1999 World Championships in Athletics.

International competitions

References

 Profile

1971 births
Living people
British male triple jumpers
English male triple jumpers
Olympic athletes of Great Britain
Athletes (track and field) at the 1992 Summer Olympics
Commonwealth Games gold medallists for England
Commonwealth Games medallists in athletics
Athletes (track and field) at the 1994 Commonwealth Games
Athletes (track and field) at the 1998 Commonwealth Games
World Athletics Championships athletes for Great Britain
Universiade medalists in athletics (track and field)
Universiade bronze medalists for Great Britain
Medalists at the 1993 Summer Universiade
Members of Thames Valley Harriers
Medallists at the 1994 Commonwealth Games